In Akkadian mythology the Rabisu ("the lurker"; Sumerian  Maškim, "deputy, attorney"), or possibly Rabasa, are vampiric spirits, daimons, or demons. The Rabisu are associated in mythology with the Curse of Akkad. A consistent translation of "Rabisu" is “Lingerers”. The Rabisu, whether intending malicious actions or not, linger around those who have been found wayward or to be rewarded by the deity Enlil.

History of Scholarship
The reason some people may feel as though Rabisu (Akkadian) or Robes (Hebrew) is an evil spirit or evil demon can be attributed to a series of books published in 1903-1904. Assyriologist Reginald Campbell Thompson published the seventeenth volume of Cuneiform Texts from Babylonian Tablets and a two-volume series Devils and Evil Spirits of Babylonia. In both of these works, the Rabisu is denoted as an evil spirit. However, this caused substantive debate and is still contested by scholars today. In 1903, the claim that the Rabisu was an evil demon spirit was contested by Hans Duhm in Die bösen Geister im Alten Testament in which he, along with Assyriologist  Charles-Francois Jean were able to compare Hebrew texts to Akkadian demonology to attest that the Rabisu was not a predatory being. In this literature, despite the assertion that the Rabisu was not evil, the entity was still referred to as a "demon" in some classifications. Some have stuck to this notion without question. However, Duhm’s assertion has been challenged from multiple angles. Others who interpreted the Hebrew Bible also reached a separate conclusion that Robes ("demon" in Hebrew) is not the same entity or in some cases not even the same religion as the spirit of the Rabisu (Akkadian Demon).

One of the main reasons people often mistake the Rabisu to be intrinsically evil is because of modern connotations of the word "demon". In ancient theology, a daimon had both an intrinsically evil and intrinsically good dichotomy. In vernacular usage, "demon" is often assumed to be evil or malicious. However this is a linguistic artifact. It is also understood by modern translation that Rabisu did not act without divine authority. That is, unless Enlil and his heavenly counsel specifically told or commanded the Rabisu to do something, they would not. Rather, they remained neutral spirits existing between the planes of heaven and earth.

Rabisu in the Bible
The book The Religion of Babylonia and Assyria by Theophilus Pinches describes the Rabisu as being "the seizer" which is "regarded as a spirit which lay in wait to pounce upon his prey".

 read:

The New American Bible, among others, asserts that the "demon lurking", which in Hebrew means "the croucher", is similar to the word Rabisu. Therefore, it is possible that this displays a continued tradition in the emerging culture of the Hebrews.

Rabisu is listed in the rituals of Šurpu which have to do with burning, such as the symbolic burning of witches. The Shurpu ritual allows the banishment of Rabisu described as "a demon that springs unawares on its victims".

Nature of the Rabisu
The spirit identified by the Akkadians as “Rabisu” is not an inherently evil spirit. Despite the Hebrew Bible referring to demons as evil by nature, the demonology expressed by the Akkadians suggests that Rabisu, rather than being an entity of evil, was an entity with no particular moral implications. Rather, the Rabisu was a spirit sent out to correct the transgressions committed by humans. “In Gen 4:7, Robes, which is routinely thought to denote a demon [in which] Akkadian texts indicate that the rabisu is a neutral being that is nothing other than a current of wind dispatched by the deities to perform certain duties” When one refers to the spirit of the Rabisu as an evil emtity (Evil Rabisu) it may be better interpreted as reference to malicious action performed by the Rabisu in response to the wayward actions of an afflicted human. That is, the malicious event does not reflect the Rabisu spirit as a whole.

The Sumerian and Akkadian deity, Enlil, a major god of the earth, sky, atmosphere and storms is the sender of the “windy beings” known as Rabisu. The Rabisu, rather than acting as predatory demons with their own malicious will, were more like links between the divine beings of Heaven and the Earth. In mythology, Enlil sent the spirit of the Rabisu as a sort of messenger. Whether the message entailed good or bad things for the receiver was not a reflection upon the Rabisu but rather the consequence of human actions, which themselves were of different moral character

The Curse of Agade
The myth of the Curse of Akkad can now be understood with this context. The Curse of Akkad, or more correctly The Curse of Agade, is a story told by Sumerians during the Third Dynasty of Ur (2047-1750BCE) about the Akkadian king Naram-Sin who was the grandson and successor of Sargon the Great. Sometimes the Curse of Agade is described as Naram-Sin’s fight with Enlil. Naram-Sin had grown discontent with himself and blamed the gods for not providing relief from his sorrows. Naram-Sin took up arms against Enlil who, in turn, sent the Rabisu to correct Naram-Sin’s transgressions. The story of the Curse of Agade ends with the complete destruction of the city of Akkad, Enlil triumphing over the earthly human domain.

Similarity to a Myth of Ubar
The story of the Curse of Agade is similar to a myth of the "lost city" of Ubar, sometimes referred to as "Atlantis of the Sands," located farther to the south in southeastern Oman. The Rabisu were noted to operate as a flock or unit, as opposed to individual spirits. It was believed that Enlil would send “flocks" of Rabisu in the form of storms of wind, sometimes carrying dust or sand storms. In one tablet from the Akkadian Empire, the author records that “A disfavorable storm arose against the land. It disturbed the people of the upper and lower territory… the awful storm, the (great) storm, that will neither be returned to the steppe-land, nor look back… Cities offer no protection, for such beings borne on the wind are able to penetrate the urban landscape. They pursue people. They invade dwellings and buildings.”  This story is nearly identical to a myth that refers to Ubar in which the gods, having grown angry with the residents of Ubar, struck it down in a great storm in which sand entirely engulfed the city and all its people.

Defeating the Rabisu
In mythology, the Rabisu, though believed to hold no moral implications, were often opposed by hero figures. In Sumerian texts, the hero is named Hendursanga, roughly translated as “Watchman of the Night.” Other translations include “Isums” which is interpretated as “Herald of the Gods, Watchman of the Streets” (University of Chicago Press 3).

In Modern Literature and Popular Culture
In the 1977 grimoire Simon Necronomicon by Peter Levenda, which draws upon a blend of real myths including Sumerian and fictional creations, Rabisu are described as ancient demons. It talks about the god Marduk who battled Tiamat, Kingu, and Azag-Thoth. In the book, among the fifty Names of Marduk is the name Nariluggaldimmerankia, which is the sixth. Nariluggaldimmerankia is said to be the sub-commander of wind demons. He is described as the foe of Rabisu and all maskim who haunt humans. Marduk's seventh name, Asaruludu, is said to have the power using his sacred word Banmaskim to banish all Maškim (a.k.a.  Rabisu).

Myths of the Rabiru as lingerers or lurkers may have inspired the title of The Lurker at the Threshold a horror novel by August Derleth.

In 2021, Supermassive Games released House of Ashes, an interactive drama horror video game set during the invasion of Iraq in 2003. A squad of American Marines find themselves trapped in an ancient Mesopotamian temple after a raid on a local village in search of weapons goes awry. Concurrently, bat-like vampiric creatures awaken from their millennia-long slumber to roam the temple and stalk and terrorize their newfound human prey.

References

Mesopotamian legendary creatures
Vampires
Mesopotamian demons
Daimons